Martinique Championnat National is the top association football league in Martinique.

It was created in 1919 and is headed by the Ligue de Football de Martinique. 14 Teams participate in this league. 
Despite being a league competition in CONCACAF since 2002 none of the Martinique teams have  ever played in CFU Club Championship or CONCACAF Champions' Cup.
The last 4 placed teams are relegated to the Martinique Promotion d'Honneur.

Samaritaine are the current champions, having won their third league title during the 2019–20 season.

Clubs competing in the 2017–18 season

Aiglon du Lamentin (Le Lamentin)
CS Case-Pilote
Club Colonial (Fort-de-France)
JS Eucalyptus (Le François)
Club Franciscain (Le François)
Emulation (Schœlcher)
Essor-Préchotain (Le Prêcheur)
Golden Lion
Golden Star (Fort-de-France)
Good Luck (Fort-de-France) (Newly promoted)
New Star (Ducos)
RC Rivière-Pilote
Samaritaine (Ste.-Marie)
RC Saint-Joseph

Relegated in 2016–17
US Diamantinoise (Le Diamant)
Excelsior (Schœlcher)
New Club (Petit-Bourg)

Relegated in 2015–16
Emulation (Schœlcher)
US Marinoise (Le Marin)
Samaritaine (Ste.-Marie)

Relegated in 2014–15
ASC du Réal de Tartane
CS Bélimois (Le Lamentin)
US Robert (Le Robert)

Relegated in 2013–14
Good Luck (Fort-de-France)
US Diamantinoise (Le Diamant)
US Riveraine

Relegated in 2012–13
AS Etoile (Basse-Pointe)
Aussaut (Ste.-Pierre)

Relegated in 2011–12
La Gauloise de Trinité (La Trinité)
Case-Pilote
Emulation (Schœlcher)

Relegated in 2010–11
Samaritaine (Ste.-Marie)
AC Vert-Pré
Rapid Club Lorrain

Relegated in 2009–10
Réveil Sportif (Gros-Morne)
RC Saint-Joseph
US Diamantinoise (Le Diamant)

Relegated in 2008–09
Samaritaine (Ste.-Marie)
New Club (Petit-Bourg)
Anses d'Arlet

Previous winners

1919 : Intrépide (Fort-de-France)
1920 : Club Colonial (Fort-de-France)
1921 : Club Colonial (Fort-de-France)
1922 : Club Colonial (Fort-de-France)
1923 : Club Colonial (Fort-de-France)
1924 : Club Colonial (Fort-de-France)
1925 : Intrépide (Fort-de-France)
1926 : Club Colonial (Fort-de-France)  
1927 : Golden Star (Fort-de-France)
1928 : Golden Star (Fort-de-France)
1929 : Golden Star (Fort-de-France)
1930 : Club Colonial (Fort-de-France)
1931 : Club Colonial (Fort-de-France)
1932 : Stade Spiritain (St.-Esprit)
1933 : Intrépide (Fort-de-France)
1934 : not held
1935 : Club Colonial (Fort-de-France)
1936 : Golden Star (Fort-de-France)
1937 : Golden Star (Fort-de-France)
1938 : Club Colonial (Fort-de-France)
1939 : Golden Star (Fort-de-France)
1940 : Club Colonial (Fort-de-France)
1941 : Club Colonial (Fort-de-France)
1942 : Club Colonial (Fort-de-France)
1943 : Club Colonial (Fort-de-France)
1944 : La Gauloise de Trinité (La Trinité)
1945 : Good Luck (Fort-de-France)
1946 : Aigle Sportif (Fort-de-France)
1947 : Aigle Sportif (Fort-de-France)
1948 : Golden Star (Fort-de-France)
1949 : Club Colonial (Fort-de-France)
1950 : La Gauloise de Trinité (La Trinité)
1951 : La Gauloise de Trinité (La Trinité)
1952 : Golden Star (Fort-de-France)
1953 : Golden Star (Fort-de-France)
1954 : Golden Star (Fort-de-France)
1955 : La Gauloise de Trinité (La Trinité)
1956 : Golden Star (Fort-de-France)
1957 : Good Luck (Fort-de-France)
1958 : Golden Star (Fort-de-France)
1959 : Golden Star (Fort-de-France)
1960 : Stade Spiritain (Saint-Esprit)
1961 : Stade Spiritain (Saint-Esprit)
1962 : Golden Star (Fort-de-France)
1963 : Aussaut (Saint-Pierre)
1964 : Club Colonial (Fort-de-France)
1965 : Club Colonial (Fort-de-France)
1966 : Aussaut (Saint-Pierre)
1967 : Aussaut (Saint-Pierre)
1968 : Aussaut (Saint-Pierre)
1969 : Éclair Rivière Salée (Rivière Salée)
1969–70 : Club Franciscain (Le François)
1970–71 : CS Vauclinois (Le Vauclin)
1971–72 : Club Colonial (Fort-de-France)
1972–73 : Aussaut (Saint-Pierre)
1973–74 : CS Vauclinois (Le Vauclin)
1974–75 : Samaritaine (Sainte-Marie)
1975–76 : Golden Star (Fort-de-France)
1976–77 : Renaissance (Sainte Anne)
1977–78 : Renaissance (Sainte Anne)
1978–79 : Renaissance (Sainte Anne)
1979–80 : La Gauloise de Trinité (La Trinité)
1980–81 : Samaritaine (Sainte-Marie)
1981–82 : RC Rivière-Pilote (Rivière-Pilote)
1982–83 : not known
1983–84 : Aiglon du Lamentin (Le Lamentin)
1984–85 : Olympique du Marin (Le Marin)
1985–86 : Golden Star (Fort-de-France)
1986–87 : not known
1987–88 : Excelsior (Schœlcher)
1988–89 : Excelsior (Schœlcher)
1989–90 : US Marinoise (Marin)
1990–91 : Aiglon du Lamentin (Le Lamentin)
1991–92 : Aiglon du Lamentin (Le Lamentin)
1992–93 : US Robert (Le Robert)   
1993–94 : Club Franciscain (Le François)
1994–95 : US Marinoise (Marin)
1995–96 : Club Franciscain (Le François)
1996–97 : Club Franciscain (Le François)
1997–98 : Aiglon du Lamentin (Le Lamentin)
1998–99 : Club Franciscain (Le François)
1999–00 : Club Franciscain (Le François)
2000–01 : Club Franciscain (Le François)
2001–02 : Club Franciscain (Le François)
2002–03 : Club Franciscain (Le François)
2003–04 : Club Franciscain (Le François)
2004–05 : Club Franciscain (Le François)
2005–06 : Club Franciscain (Le François)
2006–07 : Club Franciscain (Le François)
2007–08 : RC Rivière-Pilote
2008–09 : Club Franciscain (Le François)
2009–10 : RC Rivière-Pilote
2010–11 : Club Colonial (Fort-de-France)
2011–12 : RC Rivière-Pilote
2012–13 : Club Franciscain (Le François)
2013–14 : Club Franciscain (Le François)
2014–15 : Golden Lion
2015–16 : Golden Lion
2016–17 : Club Franciscain (Le François)
2017–18 : Club Franciscain (Le François)
2018–19 : Club Franciscain (Le François)
2019–20 : Samaritaine (Sainte-Marie)
2020-21 : Golden Lion
2021-22 : Golden Lion

Performance By Club

Top scorers

References

 
Football competitions in Martinique
Top level football leagues in the Caribbean
Football leagues in Overseas France
Sports leagues established in 1919
1919 establishments in Martinique